The Québec Capitales (French: Les Capitales de Québec) are a professional baseball team based in Quebec City, Quebec, Canada. The Capitales have been members of the Frontier League since the 2020 season after a merger between the Can-Am League and the Frontier League in October 2019. Since the 1999 season, the Capitales have played their home games at Stade Canac.

The team was established in 1999 as a member of the independent Northern League. Their mascot is Capi the Lion.

History of baseball in Quebec City
Québec City has been home to many baseball teams. The Québec Athletics played in the Québec Provincial League during the 1940 season, and in the Canadian-American League from 1941 to 1942.  The Québec Alouettes followed as a member of the Canadian-American League from 1946 to 1948.  The Quebec Braves played from 1949 to 1950, as they too were part of the Canadian-American League, and from 1950 to 1951 in the Provincial League. The Québec Indians played in the Provincial League from 1958 to 1970. The Québec Carnavals were the AA affiliate of the Montreal Expos from 1971 through 1975, as members of the Eastern League.  In 1976, the team changed its name to the Québec Metros and continued to play until 1977.

Quebec Capitales

In 1999, the Capitales joined the Northern League (East Division) as an expansion team. The Capitales are one of two Canadian teams in the league, the other being the Trois-Rivieres Aigles. As of 2019, the Capitales are the most successful team in the Can-Am League on and off the field, having won the League championship more times (7) than any other team and being among the tops in attendance every season averaging over 3,000 fans per game since 2001. Since 2000, the Capitales have made the playoffs 16 times.

In 2006, the Capitales won their first championship in team history. Although the team had the second-worst record in team history they still qualified for last postseason spot with a 44–44 record. They defeated the top seed North Shore Spirit in dramatic come from behind fashion winning the last two games to win the series 3 games to 2. In the championship series, the Capitales took a 2 games to none advantage before the Brockton Rox came back to even the series. In the final and decisive game, the Capitales defeated the Rox on their home field by coming from behind and won by a score of 5–4 to win the Can-Am League Championship 3 games to 2.

In 2009 the Capitales became the first franchise in the reborn Can-Am League to win multiple championships and the fourth team in the entire history of the Northeast/Can-Am League to win more than one championship (joining the New Jersey Jackals, who won two Northeast League and two Northern League championships, the Albany-Colonie Diamond Dogs, who won the first Northeast League Championship and one Northern League Championship, and the Adirondack Lumberjacks, who won one Northeast League and one Northern League championship). The Capitales won the 2nd half regular-season championship and finished the season with the 3rd best overall record (53-41). The Capitales eliminated the Brockton Rox 3 games to 1 in the opening round. In a rematch of the 2005 championship, the Capitales got revenge by eliminating the Worcester Tornadoes 3 games to 1. In 2010, the Capitales obtained a second consecutive championship, passing by the Pittsfield Colonials 3 games to 1. In 2011, the Capitales won their third championship in a row (fourth in all) by defeating the New Jersey Jackals 4 games to 1. In 2012, the team again defeated the Jackals 4 games to 1, thus winning their fourth championship in a row. A fifth championship in a row materialized in 2013, the Capitales defeating again the New-Jersey Jackals 4 games to 3. In 2017, the Capitales captured their seventh championship in franchise history by sweeping the Rockland Boulders 3–0.

In 2020, the Capitales moved to the Frontier League following the merger of the Can-Am League with the Frontier League. However, due to the COVID-19 pandemic and extended closure of the Canada–United States border, the league announced that the Capitales (along with the Trois-Rivières Aigles) would be unable to compete for the 2020 season (which was later cancelled). The club later announced they intended to organize a separate league in Québec for the summer as an alternative, but these plans were eventually scrapped by both clubs.

In 2021, the Capitales again saw their season canceled due to the ongoing closure of the Canada-US border. Canadian players signed by the Trois-Rivières Aigles and the Ottawa Titans had the opportunity to join the Capitales (who started the season as a traveling team known as Équipe Québec, playing exclusively in the United States), while all other non-Canadian players on the roster were subject to a proposed dispersal among the 13 United States-based teams. They started the season as a traveling team, and as of July 30, 2021, they have played a total of 21 home games including 10 at Stade Canac, and 11 at Stade Quillorama. During the July 30 game, Équipe Québec hosted the New York Boulders at Stade Canac and won the game 10-8 in front of a full house of 2,800 spectators, the maximum during sanitary measures.

On September 12, 2021, Équipe Québec qualified for the playoffs. They faced the Washington Wild Things in the semi-finals and lost 4-0 in Game #5. The crowd of 3,619 gathered at Stade Canac during game #3 represented 800 more spectators than the number allowed due to sanitary measures. Équipe Québec finished the season with a record of 52 wins and 44 losses with an average of 2,215 fans in 21 home games.

In 2022, in their first season in the Frontier League, as a local Quebec team, the Capitales are taking their first steps in this new league.

On September 19, 2022, the Capitales won their 8th championship in their history, in front of their supporters thanks to a victory in the 9th round from Ruben Castro. Noise levels in the stadium allegedly reached as high as 110 decibels when the Capitales scored runs, but most notably, when Ruben Castro hit a walk-off double in the bottom of the 9th inning the previous day on September 18, when 4,428 fans were crammed into the stadium.

Season-by-season record 

Records as of May 11, 2022

1: In 2021, Équipe Québec, a combination of the Capitales and the Trois-Rivières Aigles, played in the Frontier League.  With a record of 52—44, they finished first in the Atlantic Division, and lost the Division Series to the Washington Wild Things 3-2.

Logos and uniforms

The official colours of the Québec Capitales are navy blue and gold. The primary logo consists of a white baseball diamond with navy blue pinstripes. The "Capitales" wordmark is superimposed over the diamond in navy blue outlined in gold. The wordmark is underlined by a navy blue ribbon with the word "Québec" centred on it in white, with the French word "de" centred in between. A navy blue fleur-de-lis is centred above the wordmark, with a stylized depiction of home plate centred below.

The Québec Capitales uniforms are traditional in design. The caps are navy blue throughout with the scripted "Q" cap logo centred on the front in gold with a white centre incorporating a navy blue fleur-de-lis and red baseball threading. The home jerseys are white with navy blue pinstripes, with the "Capitales" cursive script wordmark centred across in navy blue with gold outline. The alternate jersey is navy blue with gold piping with the cap logo centred on the left-side chest.

Rivalries

Over the years, the Capitales have had several rivalries. One significant rivalry is against the New Jersey Jackals. They have both won four league championships in their histories. The Capitales defeated the Jackals three times in the championship series, 2011, 2012, and 2013.

The Capitales also have a rivalry with the Trois-Rivières Aigles. This is because both teams are geographically in the same province of Quebec.

Another rivalry was against the Ottawa Voyageurs. Even though the Voyageurs played in the Can-Am League for only two seasons, it was still a significant rivalry due to both teams playing in the same country and the closeness of both provinces of Ontario and Quebec. When the Ottawa Titans were formed in 2022, this sparked another rivalry for the Capitales because they have both the same mascot names, and are both in the same country.

Current roster

Broadcasting
Capitales games can be heard on CHYZ-FM, and all home games are presented on the CHYZ 94.3 FM website and app.

Notable alumni
 Mitch Lyden (1999)
 José Núñez (2001)
 Darryl Motley (2002)
 Jeff Harris (2003–2004)
 Juan Melo (2004)
 Marty Janzen (2005)
 Éric Cyr (2006, 2008)
 Éric Gagné (2009)
 Pete Laforest (2009, 2010–2012)
 Andrew Albers (2010)
 Troy Cate (2010)
 Steve Green (2010)
 Max St. Pierre (2012)
 Jonathan Malo (2012–2019)
 Kalian Sams (2015–2018)
 Yordan Manduley (2015–2019, 2022–present)
 Jorge Reyes (2016)
 Yurisbel Gracial (2016–2017)
 Marcus Knecht (2016–2017)
 Jordan Lennerton (2016–2018)
 Matt Marksberry (2017)
 Lázaro Blanco (2017–2018)
 Josh Vitters (2018)
 Tyson Gillies (2019)
 Dustin Molleken (2019)
 Jonathan de Marte (2019)
 Scott Richmond (2019)
 Andrew Case (2021–2022)
 Gift Ngoepe (2021)
 Evan Rutckyj (2021)
 Jared Mortensen (2021)
 Tristan Pompey (2022–present)

Attendance
As of September 4, 2022

*played with limited capacity (2,800 people)

**only counts Équipe Québec games played at Stade Canac

See also
List of baseball teams in Canada

References

External links

Frontier League teams
Baseball in Quebec City
Baseball teams in Quebec
Sports teams in Quebec City
Baseball teams established in 1999
1999 establishments in Quebec